In God We Trust: All Others Pay Cash is a novel by American humorist Jean Shepherd first published in October 1966.

A best-seller at the time of its publication, it is considered Shepherd's most important published work. The work inspired several films in the Parker Family Saga, including A Christmas Story (1983) and My Summer Story (1994). Shepherd is the narrator in both films.

About the book
Jean Shepherd was a well-known American humorist who performed on radio in the decades after World War II. Beginning in June 1964, he began adapting many of his radio stories for publication in Playboy magazine. He focused primarily on those stories which depicted his childhood in the fictional town of Hohman, Indiana (a stand-in for Shepherd's home town of Hammond, Indiana).

According to Playboy founder Hugh Hefner, author Shel Silverstein had long encouraged Shepherd to write down his radio stories, but Shepherd was reluctant to do so because he was not a writer. Eventually, Silverstein recorded Shepherd's stories on tape, transcribed them, and then together with Shepherd edited and developed them. Fellow WOR AM radio personality Barry Farber said Shepherd came to enjoy writing, as it allowed him to develop themes, and Shepherd began to work on written stories by himself.

In God We Trust: All Others Pay Cash was the first book Shepherd wrote, and contained his most popular radio stories. These stories were also some of the earliest of Shepherd's work to appear in Playboy. Although they are often described as nostalgic or memoirs, Shepherd rejected these descriptions. He argued instead that they were fictional stories about childhood. Shepherd claimed it took him three years to write the novel.

Whether the stories are truth or fiction is not entirely clear. Shepherd denied that he was merely remembering his childhood, and repeatedly asserted in interviews that his stories were entirely fictional. Scholars Penelope Joan Fritzer and Bartholomew Bland agree that the stories are entirely fictional. However, at least some elements of the novel draw on the real world. For example, the names of many of the characters in Shepherd's book can be found in Shepherd's high school yearbook, "Hohman" is the name of a major street in Hammond, Shepherd's younger brother was named Randy, and Hammond has a Cleveland Street and a Warren G. Harding Elementary School. The truth may lie somewhere in between, as Mark Skertic for the Chicago Sun-Times put it: "Hohman doesn't really exist, but the sights, sounds and events Mr. Shepherd described happening there grew out of his experiences growing up in and around real-life Hammond, Ind."

Title and structure of the book
The title of the novel is a play on words, primarily the motto "In God We Trust", which became a common motto in the 19th century in the United States, and was used on American coins frequently after 1864. "In God we trust, all others pay cash" was a common phrase in America in the early decades of the 20th century meaning that neither credit nor checks will be accepted as payment.

Shepherd specifically denied that the work is a collection of short stories. As he said on his radio show shortly after the book was finished:

I did something today that you don't do very often in your life. I delivered to my publisher - I delivered to him the completed, edited, done manuscript of a novel I have been working on for over three years, Skip. Handed it in. And you have no idea what a fantastic feeling that is! And I mean a novel. I mean a novel -novel! [emphasis in original]

Shepherd's publisher, Doubleday, also promoted the book as a novel. Eugene Bermann, however, does not consider the work a novel as it does not have either an overriding theme or consistent characters. Michael Sragow, writing for Salon.com, called the book "memoirlike".

Most of the stories in the novel are domestic in nature, discussing life in the home. They do not, however, focus on the family. They are rather stories which focus on an "amusingly old-fashioned society".

Contents
There are 31 chapters in the book. The stories in the book are told by the fictional character Ralph, who has returned to his home town of Hohman as an adult and remembers or relates these stories to his friend, Flick, who runs the bar in which Ralph spends the day. The longer stories are linked by one- or two-page chapters in which Ralph and Flick discuss their childhood or the present state of Hohman. These exchanges trigger Ralph's reminiscences.

The 2010 Broadway Books reprint of the 2000 Doubleday paperback version of the book lists the following longer stories:
"Duel in the Snow, or Red Ryder Nails the Cleveland Street Kid"
"The Counterfeit Secret Circle Member Gets the Message, or The Asp Strikes Again"
"The Endless Streetcar Ride Into the Night, and the Tinfoil Noose"
"Hairy Geertz and the Forty-Seven Crappies"
"My Old Man and the Lascivious Special Award That Heralded the Birth of Pop Art"
"The Magic Mountain"
"Grover Dill and the Tasmanian Devil"
"Ludlow Kissel and the Dago Bomb That Struck Back"
"Uncle Ben and the Side-Splitting Knee-Slapper, or Some Words Are Loaded"
"Old Man Pulaski and the Infamous Jawbreaker Blackmail Caper"
"The Perfect Crime"
"Wilbur Duckworth and His Magic Baton"
"Miss Bryfogel and the Frightening Case of the Speckle-Throated Cuckold"
"'Nevermore', Quoth the Assessor, 'Nevermore ...'"
"Leopold Doppler and the Great Orpheum Gravy Boat Riot"

Critical reception
Eugene Bergmann has called the novel Shepherd's most important work, and anthology editor Gardner Dozois noted in 2002 that it is also Shepherd's best known work. The novel was a New York Times best-seller in 1966. At the time of Shepherd's death in 1999, it had been through 10 printings.

In God We Trust: All Others Pay Cash was the 142nd best-selling novel on Amazon.com the week after Shepherd died, when the novel was 33 years old.

Adaptations
Four of the short stories ("Duel in the Snow", "The Counterfeit Secret Circle Member Gets the Message", "My Old Man and the Lascivious Special Award That Heralded the Birth of Pop Art", and "Grover Dill and the Tasmanian Devil") were used as the basis for A Christmas Story. Some phrases and small elements of other stories were also used for that film. Another short story used for the film, "The Grandstand Passion Play of Delbert and the Bumpus Hounds", appeared in Shepherd's second book of stories, Wanda Hickey's Night of Golden Memories.

The five short stories that were used as the basis for A Christmas Story were collected under the title A Christmas Story and published as a stand-alone book in 2003.

Other short stories in the book were used for the 1994 sequel My Summer Story.

See also
 Parker Family Saga (franchise)

References

Bibliography
 Bergmann, Eugene B. Excelsior, You Fathead!: The Art and Enigma of Jean Shepherd. New York: Applause Theatre & Cinema Books, 2005.
 Dozois, Gardner R., ed. The Year's Best Science Fiction: Nineteenth Annual Collection. New York: St. Martin's Griffin, 2002.
 Fritzer, Penelope Joan and Bland, Bartholomew. Merry Wives and Others: A History of Domestic Humor Writing. Jefferson, N.C. McFarland & Co., 2002.
 Gaines, Caseen. A Christmas Story: Behind the Scenes of a Holiday Classic. Toronto: ECW Press, 2013.
 Niezgoda, Frank. Fish Food: Teach Us to Fish Lord. Maitland, Fla.: Xulon Press, 2009.
 Shepherd, Jean. In God We Trust, All Others Pay Cash. New York: Broadway Books, 2010.

1966 American novels
Works by Jean Shepherd
Doubleday (publisher) books
American comedy novels
American novels adapted into films